Baltimore Hebrew University was founded as Baltimore Hebrew College and Teachers Training School in 1919 to promote Jewish scholarship and academic excellence. It was the only institution of higher learning in Maryland devoted solely to all aspects of Judaic and Hebraic studies. Located in the northwest, Park Heights neighborhood of Baltimore, BHU conferred degrees up to the doctorate level. Though small in size, with classes having between 8 and 25 students, it had strong ties to the community and to several other local colleges and universities.

Baltimore Hebrew University merged with Towson University, officially becoming the Baltimore Hebrew Institute, in 2009. The entire BHU library is now housed at TU's Albert S. Cook Library, including special collections of rare books, Yizkor books, a collection of items related to Jewish cultural reconstruction, and testimonies from survivors of the Holocaust.  The BHU building on Park Heights Avenue was demolished in October 2009.

Notable faculty and alumni
 Robert Freedman 
 Jon S. Cardin 
 Joseph M. Baumgarten
 Barry Freundel
 Steven Fine
Eli Velder

See also 
 List of Jewish universities and colleges in the United States

References

External links
 Official site of Baltimore Hebrew Institute
 Hirsch, Rona S. "Baltimore Hebrew University," Chicago Tribune, August 29, 2002.
 "Towards the 21st Century - A Recommended Strategic Plan for the Baltimore Hebrew University", Bainbridge, Jay. Baker, Sally. Meier, James. Meislin, Laura. Ukeles, Jacob B. Ukeles Associates, Inc., Baltimore Hebrew Institute. 1993

Jewish education in Maryland
Jewish universities and colleges in the United States
Jews and Judaism in Baltimore
Universities and colleges in Baltimore
Educational institutions established in 1919
Park Heights, Baltimore
1919 establishments in Maryland
Defunct private universities and colleges in Maryland
2009 disestablishments in Maryland
Educational institutions disestablished in 2009